Club Gel Puigcerdà is an ice hockey club in Puigcerdà, Spain. They play in the Spanish League and their home arena is the Club Poliesportiu Puigcerdà.

History 
Club Gel Puigcerdà was born in 1956 when a team created in the school Pensionat d'Alta Muntanya played the first match on the frozen lake of Puigcerdà. The ice hockey venue was inaugurated in 1958 with an international festival of ice. From this festival, the hockey clubs of the village as AEP (Alumni of the School Pia) played several games, so with Catalan teams or foreign. In 1983 was inaugurated the current pavilion where the club plays. On 8 August 2006 the women team of CG Puigcerdà played their first match.

Titles 

 5 Spanish leagues: 1985-86, 1988–89, 2005–06, 2006–07, 2007–08
 11 Spanish ice hockey cups: 1982-83, 1983–84, 1985–86, 1991–92, 1998–99, 2003–04, 2004–05, 2006–07, 2007–08, 2008–09, 2009–10
 2 Federation cups: 2005-06, 2006–07
 5 Catalan ice hockey cups: 1984-85, 2002–03, 2003–04, 2005–06, 2007–08
 1 u18-Spanish Leagues: 1997-98
 1 u20 Spanish ice hockey cup: 1986-87

External links
  Official website

Ice hockey teams in Catalonia
1956 establishments in Spain
Sport in Girona
Ice hockey clubs established in 1956